Kangasvuori is one of the districts of Jyväskylä, Finland. It's a part of the Huhtasuo ward and it's the oldest district in the ward. Kangasvuori was mostly built during 1965–1976.

Seppälä, Pupuhuhta, Rasinrinne, Läntinen Kangasvuori and Itäinen Kangasvuori are subareas of the district. Seppälä has mostly stores and industrial buildings, Pupuhuhta is a suburb built in the 1970s and the Rasinrinne area was started to build in the 1990s. Läntinen Kangasvuori contains mostly apartment buildings that were built in 1960s and 1970s, whereas Itäinen Kangasvuori has mostly row houses and single-family houses along with some apartment buildings.

Gallery

References 

Neighbourhoods of Jyväskylä